The Lola T190 was an open-wheel formula race car, designed, developed and built by Lola Cars, for Formula 5000 racing, in 1969. A total of 17 models were produced.

References

T190
Formula 5000 cars